Encalyptales is an order of mosses in subclass Funariidae.  It contains a single family.

References

 
Moss orders
Monotypic plant orders